Gert Hermod Nygårdshaug (born 22 March 1946 at Tynset) is a Norwegian author. He has written poems, children's books and novels, and is in particular known for the series of crime novels featuring the gastronomer amateur detective Fredric Drum.

Nygårdshaug's writing enjoys a diverse background from his extensive knowledge and travelling, in particular in South America. Ancient cultures, archaeology, fly fishing, gastronomy and wine are some of the recurring themes in his novels based on his own personal interests and hobbies.

In 2004 the South African film company Lithium Entertainment bought the film rights to four of Nygårdshaug's books: Mengele Zoo, Himmelblomsttreets muligheter (Heaven’s Flower Tree), Prost Gotvins geometri (Priest Gotvin’s Geometry) and Afrodites basseng (The Pool of Aphrodite).

The eco crime novel Mengele Zoo (1989) was in 2007 voted "the People's Favourite" during the literature festival of Lillehammer.

Nygårdshaug resides in Lier, and has been a minor ticket candidate for the political party Red.

List of works
Impulser (1966) poems
Paxion (1971) poems
Et bilde et verktøy (1974) poems
Gatevinden (1980) poems
Solfiolinen (1981) short stories
Bastionen (1982) novel
Alkymisten (1983) short stories
Dverghesten (1984) novel
Honningkrukken (1985) crime novel
Nullpluss (1986) novel
Jegerdukken (1987) crime novel
Gipsyblink (1988) poems
Mengele Zoo (1989) novel
Dødens codex (1990) crime novel
Søthjerte (1991) Novel
Det niende prinsipp (1992) crime novel
Cassandras finger (1993) crime novel
Gipsymann (1994) poems
Trollet og de syv prinsessene (1995) children's stories
Himmelblomsttreets muligheter (1995) novel
Kiste nummer fem (1996) crime novel
Gutten og trollsverdet (1996) children's stories
Huldergubben i Svartberget (1997) children's stories
Prost Gotvins geometri (1998) novel
Pengegryta i Trollberget – og andre eventyr (1999) children's stories
Den balsamerte ulven (2000) crime novel
Liljer fra Jerusalem (2001) crime novel
Farivis Ruvis - Gutten fra himmelrommet - Dinosaurene (2001) children's stories
Afrodites basseng (2003) novel
Alle orkaners mor (2004) crime novel
Rødsonen (2006) crime novel
Fortellernes marked (2008) novel
Klokkemakeren (2009) novel
Samlede eventyr (2009) children's stories
Chimera (2011) novel
Pergamentet (2013) novel
Nøkkelmakeren (2014) novel
Eclipse i mai (2015) novel
Budbringeren (2016) crime novel
Zoo Europa (2018) novel
Den tredje engelen (2020) crime novel

References

    
 Gert Nygårdshaug profile Cappelen Damm 

Footnotes

External links
 Gert Nygårdshaug unofficial site 
 Gert Nygårdshaug articles in Dagbladet 
 Gert Nygårdshaug articles in Aftenposten 
 "Vi som ikke tente lys for USA" essay in Dagbladet following the September 11 attacks 

1946 births
Living people
People from Tynset
People from Lier, Norway
20th-century Norwegian novelists
21st-century Norwegian novelists
Norwegian children's writers
Norwegian crime fiction writers